Robert E. Quirk (September 22, 1918 – May 23, 2009) was an American historian, and professor emeritus at Indiana University.

Awards
 1961 Frederick Jackson Turner Award
 1965 Guggenheim Fellow

Works

References

External links
"Fidel Castro; Cuba After the Cold War", Foreign affairs, Kenneth Maxwell, September/October 1993
"Indiana University History Department Centennial, 1994 "

20th-century American historians
20th-century American male writers
1918 births
2009 deaths
Indiana University faculty
American male non-fiction writers